Bactra verutana, the javelin moth, is a species of moth of the family Tortricidae. It is found in North America, where it has been recorded from Florida, Texas, Mississippi, North Carolina, Indiana, Missouri, Ontario, Alberta, Quebec and Labrador. It is also found in Cuba, Mexico, Panama, Paraguay, Puerto Rico, Mozambique and South Africa. The habitat consists of prairies, aspen parkland, foothills and mixed wood areas.

The wingspan is 11–17 mm. The forewings are light brown with a number of darker brown areas. The hindwings are sooty brown.

The larvae feed on the leaves, fascicles and basal bulbs of Cyperus esculentus, Scirpus and Juncus species.

References

Moths described in 1875
Bactrini